The 1986 FIFA World Cup qualification UEFA Group 2 was a UEFA qualifying group for the 1986 FIFA World Cup. The group comprised Czechoslovakia, Malta, Portugal, Sweden and West Germany.

The group was won by West Germany with Portugal as the runners up. Both teams qualified for the 1986 FIFA World Cup.

Standings

Results

Goalscorers

5 goals

 Fernando Gomes

4 goals

 Robert Prytz
 Karl-Heinz Rummenigge

3 goals

 Petr Janečka
 Carlos Manuel
 Dan Corneliusson
 Klaus Allofs
 Pierre Littbarski
 Uwe Rahn

2 goals

 Leonard Farrugia
 Diamantino Miranda
 Thomas Sunesson
 Matthias Herget
 Rudi Völler

1 goal

 Jan Berger
 Stanislav Griga
 Vladimír Hruška
 Karel Jarolím
 Vladislav Lauda
 Josef Novák
 Ladislav Vízek
 Carmel Busuttil
 Michael Degiorgio
 Raymond Xuereb
 Rui Jordão
 José Rafael
 Ingemar Erlandsson
 Lars Larsson
 Mats Magnusson
 Torbjörn Nilsson
 Glenn Strömberg
 Thomas Berthold
 Andreas Brehme
 Karlheinz Förster
 Felix Magath
 Lothar Matthäus

1 own goal

 Frederico Rosa (playing against Malta)
 Andreas Ravelli (playing against Czechoslovakia)

External links
Fifa.com page
Rsssf page
Results and Scorers

2
1984–85 in German football
Qual
1984–85 in Portuguese football
Portugal at the 1986 FIFA World Cup
1984 in Swedish football
1985 in Swedish football
1984–85 in Czechoslovak football
1985–86 in Czechoslovak football
1984–85 in Maltese football
1985–86 in Maltese football
1983–84 in Maltese football